Constance Helen Gladman (23 December 1922 – 30 November 1964), also known as Sr. Mary Rosina, was a professed religious of the Daughters of Our Lady of the Sacred Heart and a Servant of God. There is current action to seek her canonisation.

She was born in Koroit, Victoria the oldest of seven children, raised in Warrong and educated in Warrnambool  and Melbourne.

She died in Kokopo (Near Rabaul), on the island of New Britain, Papua New Guinea. Sister Rosina was beheaded in her classroom while working as a teaching nun among impoverished communities.

There is a push for her canonisation as a martyr.

References

1922 births
1964 deaths
20th-century Australian Roman Catholic nuns
Australian educators
Female Roman Catholic missionaries
Australian Roman Catholic missionaries
Australian people murdered abroad
People murdered in Papua New Guinea
Roman Catholic missionaries in Papua New Guinea
Australian expatriates in Papua New Guinea
Missionary educators
Deaths by decapitation
Servants of God